Kirti Sri Rajasinha (Sinhala: කීර්ති ශ්‍රී රාජසිංහ, Tamil: கீர்த்தி ஸ்ரீ ராஜசிங்கம்; 11 August 1747 – 2 January 1782) was the second Nayaka king of Kandy.  He was a prince from the Madurai Nayak Dynasty and the brother-in-law of Sri Vijaya Raja Singha. He succeeded his brother-in-law to the throne in 1751.

The king is credited for the revival of Buddhism and literature in Sri Lanka. Under the guidance and influence of Weliwita Sri Saranankara Thero,  with Dutch assistance, king Kirti Sri Raja Singha successfully invited Bhikkus from Siam (Thailand) to revive the higher ordination of Buddhist monks in Sri Lanka.

He also built the existing inner temple of the Sacred Tooth Relic and  Raja Maha Vihara (Gangarama) in Kandy. During his reign the Mahavamsa chronicle was continued from the time of Parakramabahu IV of Dambadeniya. He also rebuilt the Munneswaram temple close to Chilaw.

Attack on Dutch Forts
In 1761 King Kirti Sri Rajasinha attacked the Dutch garrisons and forts at Matara, Katuwana, Tangalle, Marakade and Urubokke, completely destroying them, and killing Dutch while some surrendered and ended up as prisoners.

In order to revenge the humiliation, the new Dutch governor Van Eck had immediate plans to attack Kandy, but the weakness in fortification and garrison forbade the Dutch. Later they did attack in 1764 and in 1765. Hence, in the early part of 1763 the Dutch were only consolidating their positions and gradually expelling Kandyans from the territories taken over from Dutch. Throughout 1763 the King continually sought peace and sent his envoys to discuss terms. The Governor wished the King to cede the three four and seven Korales and Puttlam and hand over the entire coastline of island to the Dutch. The king was not agreeable to any demand that diminished his sovereignty and was deliberately delaying a settlement hoping for help from the English in Madras after his discussion and negotiations with John Pybus 1762.

Meeting with the British
The King in mid-1762 sought help from the Governor of Fort St George Madras for assistance. The British eager to obtain the monopoly of trading in cinnamon, pepper, betel nut (puwak) from the Kandyan Kings also wanted to expel the Dutch from the coasts. A reason to call on the British for assistance by the Kandyan King in 1762 was that after the treaty of Paris, the Dutch poured troops into Sri Lanka. They were bent on capturing Kandy from six directions (1764). Anticipating such a scenario the King sent an envoy to the English Governor of Madras to assist him in expelling the Dutch. This envoy, a junior Kandyan Official in the military made a clandestine trip to Madras Fort, and the English responded by sending their councilor Mr Pybus.

John Pybus, a writer of the British East India Company, sailed to Kandy with a backup of five ships and about 200 armed men. A British vessel brought Pybus to Trincomalee on 5 May 1762. The Dutch knew of the arrival of Pybus through their spies and they were kept informed of his movements. Pybus took an exhausting covert trip to meet the King on 24 May 1762. After several talks without any conclusive decisions Pybus left after a month. The King gave him a ring, sword, a gold chain with breast jewels and left the country crossing the river at Puttalam pass while the Dissawa who accompanied Pybus presented the ships commander Samuel Cornish a gold chain and a ring in the name of King "Keerthi Sri Rajasinha ".

John Pybus in his notes described the King as a man of tolerable stature, reddish in complexion and very brisk in his movements. Pybus was amazed as to how the Kandyans had managed to fight a war with Dutch and had captured Matara Dutch Fort. He wrote that "They had put every European to the sword except two officers who are now prisoners of the country."

The Dutch attacked Kandy once again in 1765 and in this occasion, both parties suffered severe casualties. The king went to Hanguranketha and hid there for safety. Battles continued for months and the king wanted peace with the Dutch due to the widening of internal issues of the Kingdom of Kandy. Taking advantage of this opportunity the Dutch forwarded a treaty biased towards the themselves. The king, having no other option signed the treaty in 1766. The Kingdom of Kandy lost its access to the ocean by this treaty.

Marriage
He married the daughter of one Nadukattu Sami Nayakkar in 1749. He further married three more Nayakkar queens from Madurai, but had no children. He also married two daughters of Vijaya Manna Naicker who was the grandson of Vijaya Raghava Nayak. He had six daughters and two sons by his favorite Sinhala lady (Yakada Doli), daughter of the late Dissava (Headman) of Bintenna, granddaughter of the blind and aged Mampitiya Dissave. Both his sons survived the king and his daughters married Nayakkar relatives of the king. Mampitiya’s sons claim for the throne was overlooked and the choice fell on the king’s brother who was living in court.

The king died on January 2, 1782, of the injuries caused two months before by a fall from his horse after a reign of 35 years which the people saw as a great religious revival, and had a sentimental attachment to the King.

Statues 

There are very many life-size portraits of King Kirti Sri Raja Singha in all  the temples he renovated and built. But the most famous are the four life sized wooden statues of the king today, two of them can be seen at Dambulla temple and at Malwatta temple in Kandy.

See also
 Mahavamsa
 List of monarchs of Sri Lanka
 History of Sri Lanka

Sources
 Kings and Rulers of Sri Lanka

References

External links
 Galagoda Adikaram - Chief Minister of King Keerthi Sri Rajasinghe

1782 deaths
Deaths by horse-riding accident
Monarchs of Kandy
1734 births
Rajasinha
Rajasinha
K
Buddhist revivalists